CYP20A1  (cytochrome P450, family 20, subfamily A, polypeptide 1) is a protein which in humans is encoded by the CYP20A1 gene.

This gene encodes a member of the cytochrome P450 superfamily of enzymes. The cytochrome P450 proteins are monooxygenases that catalyze many reactions involved in pollutant and drug metabolism and the synthesis of cholesterol, steroids, and other lipids. CYP20A1 lacks one amino acid of the conserved heme binding site. It also lacks the conserved I-helix motif AGX(D,E)T, suggesting that its substrate may carry its own oxygen.

CYP20A1 has no identified substrate or biological role and is considered an "orphan" P450.

References

External links

Further reading